Ecteinascidia is a sea squirt genus in the family Perophoridae.

References 

Enterogona
Tunicate genera
Taxa named by William Abbott Herdman